Entertainment is a 2015 American drama film directed by Rick Alverson, starring Gregg Turkington, Tye Sheridan, and John C. Reilly. It is loosely based on Turkington's Neil Hamburger character. The plot follows a stand-up comedian as he performs in various locations where the audience is either hostile or indifferent to him. Alverson, Turkington and Tim Heidecker co-wrote the film.

The film premiered at the Sundance Film Festival in 2015. It was released in a limited theatrical release by Magnolia Pictures in North America, and through video on demand in November 2015, receiving a generally positive reception from film critics. This is the final film to star Dean Stockwell prior to his retirement and death.

Plot
After touring an aircraft boneyard in the California desert, the film's main subject (Gregg Turkington) performs a stand-up routine as the character of Neil Hamburger to an audience of prisoners following a clown act by "Eddie the Opener" (Tye Sheridan). The convicts react positively to his openly sexist, racist, and homophobic jokes. Back at his hotel, he leaves a voicemail for his daughter while a soap opera plays on television. The next morning, he hikes across rock formations before performing at a bar, but the show goes poorly as few patrons laugh and one heckles him. This causes the performer to express irritation (in character) with the audience and the heckler.

The performer's cousin John (John C. Reilly) approaches him after the show and awkwardly converses about the unenthusiastic audience while passively criticizing the raunchiness of his routine. He responds defensively to the criticisms and blames the poor reception of the routine on the heckler. At another hotel that night, the comedian leaves a second voicemail for his daughter. The next day, he tours an oil field. Another show takes place that night at another bar. Eddie the Opener gets a relatively positive reaction from the crowd, but the main character receives very little positivity himself, expressing the same in-character frustrations with the audience. After being told by the manager of the establishment that no hotel rooms are available, he stays at the house of the manager's cousin. A female member of the family watches the main character sleep as an image of him in a hallway dressed entirely in white appears on-screen.

He tours a ghost town the next day, leaving a very despondent voicemail for his daughter in which he laments how hard it is to reach her. He spends the rest of the day with  his cousin John, who drunkenly attempts to encourage the main character that night. The comedian goes to a bowling alley and a shooting park the following day before crashing a chromotherapy seminar that night and falling asleep in the midst of it. At his hotel, he runs into the woman who was giving the lecture (Lotte Verbeek). She puts him in a red-light therapy booth before setting up chairs for another seminar, and he watches the same soap opera again in his hotel room. Another show takes place the next day, but only Eddie is shown performing to a wildly energetic crowd. The comedian gets a call from an online filmmaker who wants him to star in a video. He arrives in the desert with the filmmakers the next day but soon wanders off, seemingly impatient and irritated.

Before a show, Eddie approaches the comedian and briefly expresses his gratitude for working with him, but the performer responds somewhat indifferently. The show goes disastrously: not a single patron of the bar laughs and the comedian aims extremely vulgar insults at a woman (Amy Seimetz), who throws a drink at him before leaving the bar, then assaults him as he is walking to his car. Eddie tries to help him by taking him to his hotel room, but the comedian eventually lashes out at his partner as well.

The next morning, the comedian stops on the road to examine a wrecked car. He hits a dog on the road that night, and later, in a public bathroom, a stranger named Tommy (Michael Cera) claims his car has broken down and asks if the performer can keep him company while he waits for help. The Comedian responds very little, staring blankly. He gets extremely drunk in his hotel room and leaves another voicemail to his daughter in which he quietly sings Ave Maria.

Later, the comedian performs at a party where he ends up staying the night. Afterwards, he visits a public restroom where he investigates the cries of a woman coming from the women's restroom. He finds a woman in labor who begs for his help; the film cuts to the bloodied comedian falling asleep against the wall of the bathroom as he holds the presumably stillborn infant. He wakes up the next morning to find children smearing chocolate on the window of the car he was sleeping in.

That night, during his act, the comedian picks up a trophy at the venue, aims it at the audience, and pretends to fire at them; he eventually resorts to making fart noises with his mouth before walking off stage. The manager of the venue tells him, "We're not paying for that" before the performer leaves. He later leaves a fifth voicemail for his daughter in a public restroom.

At the pool party of a celebrity (Tim Heidecker) the next day, the comedian emerges from a cake before having a mental breakdown on stage and throwing himself into the pool. As he swims to the edge of the pool, images appear of him dripping wet on stage, wearing the same white outfit seen before, and exiting a jail cell. He enters the set of the soap opera that he had been watching; the film ends as the comedian has a manic episode while watching himself on screen.

Cast

 Gregg Turkington as The Comedian
 Tye Sheridan as Eddie the Opener
 John C. Reilly as Cousin John
 Lotte Verbeek as The Chromotherapist
 Michael Cera as Tommy
 Amy Seimetz as Woman in Bar
 David Yow as Party Host
 Tim Heidecker as The Celebrity
 Dean Stockwell as The Celebrity's Henchman
 Natalia Contreras as Ruben's Girlfriend
 Annabella Lwin as Airplane Tour Guide
 Dustin Guy Defa as Ruben

Production
Gregg Turkington had previously appeared in director Rick Alverson's The Comedy. Alverson proposed to Turkington the idea of making a film based on his character Neil Hamburger. The two discussed what Hamburger's character would be like off stage, both finding that his life would be dull and not very dynamic. Turkington had been previously offered to make a film or television programs revolving around the character approaching people in the street which he felt was wrong for the character and was far more interested in a film that he described as a "Two-Lane Blacktop” art film kind of vibe."

The film's script was written by Alverson, Turkington and Tim Heidecker. The film's dialogue is improvised. Turkington described the dialogue as "really more based on descriptions of the tone or the mood that was needed in particular scenes, and kind of running with that.

Turkington and Alverson initially disagreed on some aspects of the Neil Hamburger character, such as never showing the character without his glasses and never showing the character talking in a normal voice. 
Alverson felt the film wouldn't be credible if Turkington constantly spoke in his Neil Hamburger voice. Among the locations Hamburger visits in the film is an aircraft boneyard. No actual tours take place at the location which was part of a military facility in Mojave, California, which allowed them a few hours to film where they could only shoot the film in certain directions.

Release and reception
Entertainment premiered at the Next Section at the Sundance Film Festival on January 25, 2015. It received generally favorable reviews. The film has an 80% approval rating on the review aggregator website Rotten Tomatoes, based on forty reviews, with the consensus: "As brilliantly and uncomfortably confrontational as its protagonist, Entertainment is a boundary-blurring exercise in cinematic misanthropy that more than lives up to its title." Metacritic, which assigns a weighted average score, gave the film a 65 out of 100 based on thirteen reviews from critics. In The New Yorker, critic Richard Brody calls Turkington's character an "intentionally, repulsively unfunny comedian" and Alverson's film a "wildly imaginative, grimly sardonic anti-comedy."

Notes

External links

American drama films
2015 drama films
2010s English-language films
Films set in hotels
2010s American films